Carré de l'Est is a French cheese originating from Lorraine. Its place of origin and square shape give it its name (literally "square of the East").

Carré de l'Est is produced from cow's milk and is aged five weeks.  It has a smokey bacon flavour.

References

French cheeses
Cow's-milk cheeses
Lorraine